Finn Kinneberg is a Norwegian ski-orienteering competitor. He won a silver medal in the relay at the World Ski Orienteering Championships in Aigen im Ennstal in 1982, together with Tore Sagvolden, Morten Berglia and Sigurd Dæhli. He won a bronze medal in the relay at the 1984 World Championships.

References

Year of birth missing (living people)
Living people
Norwegian orienteers
Male orienteers
Ski-orienteers
20th-century Norwegian people